Emma A. Jane (born 1969), previously known as Emma Tom, is an Australian professor, author, and journalist.

She once wrote a weekly column for The Australian newspaper and made regular appearances on Australian television and radio. She received an Edna Ryan Award in 2001 for humour. Jane has written ten books including Deadset, a first novel which won the 1998 Commonwealth Writers' Prize for Best First Book for South East Asia and the South Pacific.

Jane completed a PhD at the University of New South Wales' Journalism and Media Research Centre (JMRC), where she then became an associate professor. Her areas of research include communication, media studies, culture, and gender and sexuality.

She has sung and played bass in Australian rock bands The Titanics (with her then-husband David McCormack) and 16dd.

Bibliography
Deadset, Vintage, 1997, 
Babewatch, Hodder Headline, 1998, 
Evidence, HarperCollins Publishers Australia, 2002, 
Something about Mary: From Girl about Town to Crown Princess, Pluto Press, 2005, 
Bali: paradise lost?, Pluto Press Australia, 2006, 
Attack of the Fifty-Foot Hormones: Your One-Stop Survival Guide to Staying Sane During Pregnancy, HarperCollins Publishers Australia, 2009, 
Modern Conspiracy – The Importance of Being Paranoid, coauthored with Chris Fleming, Bloomsbury Publishing, 2014. 
Cultural Studies: Theory and Practice, coauthored with Chris Barker, SAGE, 2016. 
Cybercrime and its Victims, coauthored with Elena Martellozzo, Routledge, 2017. 
Misogyny Online: A Short (and Brutish) History, SAGE, 2017.

References

External links

1969 births
Living people
20th-century Australian novelists
21st-century Australian novelists
Australian columnists
Australian musicians
Australian television personalities
Women television personalities
Australian women novelists
20th-century Australian women writers
21st-century Australian women writers
Australian women columnists
University of New South Wales alumni
Academic staff of the University of New South Wales